Cloacal exstrophy (EC) is a severe birth defect wherein much of the abdominal organs (the bladder and intestines) are exposed. It often causes the splitting of the bladder, genitalia, and the anus. It is sometimes called OEIS  complex. 

Diagnostic tests can include ultrasound, voiding cystourethrogram (VCUG), intravenous pyelogram (IVP), nuclear renogram, computerized axial tomography (CT scan), and magnetic resonance imaging (MRI). Cloacal exstrophy is a rare birth defect, present in 1/200,000 pregnancies and 1/400,000 live births. It is associated with a defect of the ventral body wall and can be caused by inhibited mesodermal migration. The defect can often be comorbid with spinal bifida and kidney abnormalities.

See also
 Bladder exstrophy

References

External links 

Congenital disorders of urinary system

Rare diseases
Intersex variations